WHIRL Magazine is a lifestyle and sports magazine published in Pittsburgh, in the U.S. state of Pennsylvania.

Cover stars included Beth Ostrosky Stern, Christina Aguilera, Taylor Swift and President of the United States, Barack Obama.

Edible Allegheny
Edible Allegheny is a bi-monthly publication. It promotes western Pennsylvania's food movement, its distinct culinary styles, and its huge community of growers, producers, chefs, and food artisans.

References

External links
Official Whirl Magazine site
Official Edible Allegheny Magazine site

2001 establishments in Pennsylvania
2019 disestablishments in Pennsylvania
Lifestyle magazines published in the United States
Monthly magazines published in the United States
Defunct magazines published in the United States
Magazines established in 2001
Magazines disestablished in 2019
Magazines published in Pittsburgh